The School of Geography is part of the Faculty of Environment at The University of Leeds based in the UK.

History 

The University of Leeds was one of the earliest British universities to establish a school of geography in 1919. Various types of geography, including commercial geography, had been taught at the Yorkshire College (which preceded the University of Leeds) and in the university economics department before 1919. This reflects an earlier and broader European interest in the use of geographical knowledge as an aid to national and international trade. The early, inter-war years were characterized by small numbers of staff and honours students, very few research students, and limited resources and range of topics covered. The school has generally expanded over the years and in 2011 has about 70 members of academic staff and a large number of research students studying a broad spectrum of geographical topics.

The School of Geography is now spread over the Garstang Building, the Irene Manton Building, and the LC Miall Building, all in close neighbourhood in the southern part of the main campus.

A celebrated historical geographer, Robin Butlin has developed a history of the school and presented this twice at anniversary celebrations. Hopefully some of this material will become linked here in due course. (Unfortunately neither of these presentations were video recorded.)

In the recent past the school was the hub of a major glaciology research group headed by Tavi Murray now based at the University of Swansea.

Various notable people have worked or studied in the school including: Danny Dorling and Stan Openshaw; Martine Croxall and Piers Sellers. Other notable people are still based there albeit in an emeritus capacity including Robin Butlin, Mike Kirkby and Phil Rees.

Teaching 
One of the larger geography departments in the UK, with over 600 single honours undergraduate students, 55 masters students and 60 research postgraduate students in 2011. It offers a range of BA and BSc undergraduate programmes some offered in conjunction with other university departments, including, the Institute for Transport Studies 
and the School of Earth and Environment. A range of geography elective modules are available for students from any discipline undertaking courses at Leeds.

It offers a number of MA, MSc and MRes courses, including both vocationally orientated and research-focused courses. Many of these courses are also available as Postgraduate Diploma (PGDip) or Postgraduate Certificate (PGCert) courses and are also available under the part-time study scheme. In addition to face-to-face taught programmes, the GIS programme is available as a flexible, part-time, on-line distance learning programme in which students can structure their study around other commitments.

PhD research at the school attracts students from around the world. The postgraduate research community is broadly divided among the five research clusters. Each of these maintain a list of topics they are interested in supervising. In addition to those listed, the school welcomes applications from prospective students that detail their own ideas for research in a proposal form.

Research 
Its aim is to be at the forefront of research, helping to tackle major social, political and environmental challenges associated with global change.

In the 2008 RAE exercise, it was ranked in the top six geography departments in the UK and awarded an 'Excellent' grading by HEFCE for the quality of its teaching, which is research-led. 70% of its research activity was judged to be 'internationally leading' or 'internationally excellent'.

It currently has five research clusters about which the school administration and teaching is organised:
 The Ecology and Global Change research cluster is active in tropical ecology, paleogeography, and global scale modelling research.
 The Centre for Spatial Analysis and Policy (CSAP) research cluster is active in retail geography, geodemographics, demographic modelling, wilderness, and city and regional planning research.
 The River Basin Processes and Management research cluster is active in peatland, uplands, stream ecology, and glacial outburst flood research.
 The Cities and Social Justice research cluster is active in neoliberal, consumption, sustainability and activism research 
 The Citizenship and Belonging research cluster is active in citizenship, diaspora, ethnicity, and sexuality research 

On-going research is examining major world cities and some of the remotest places on earth including the Arctic and Antarctic and within the depths of the tropical rainforest.

Water@leeds is a multimillion-pound university centre led by Joseph Holden.

Global alliances of forest researchers in South America (RAINFOR)  and in Africa (AfriTRON)  are led by Oliver Phillips and Simon Lewis.

The spirit of Stan Openshaw lives on in the school with the flame carried by those members of the Centre for Computational Geography (CCG) - an inter-disciplinary university research centre concerned with the development and application of tools for analysis, visualisation and modelling geographical systems. Set up with £8 thousand in 1993, the CCG sustains itself via collaboration on a diverse range of research projects and is directed by Andy Evans.

Facilities at the school include a suite of teaching and research laboratories dedicated to soil, water and pollen research. There are field equipment stores, cold rooms and DEFRA approved soil rooms. For work in the field, the school has a 110 Land Rover Defender and a Skoda 4x4 estate vehicle. To support their GIS and computing activities they have a 24-hour cluster with provision for 25 students. The school has a range or audio visual equipment available to hire.

Staff 
There are around 70 academic and research staff, 60 research postgraduate students and a team of professional support staff in 2011. The current Head of School is Robert M. Vanderbeck. Previous incumbents include David Bell, Gill Valentine, Adrian McDonald, Graham Clarke, John Stillwell, Phil Rees, Mike Kirkby and Alan Wilson.

Alumni 
Alumni include: Piers Sellers, NASA astronaut; Simon Rix, bassist of Leeds-based band the Kaiser Chiefs; Jon Hammond, gold, silver and bronze medal winner in the men's 50m shooting at the 2010 Commonwealth Games in Delhi, Martine Croxall, BBC journalist and presenter and the Most Reverend Alan Harper, Archbishop of Armagh (appointed an OBE for services to conservation).

The School keeps in touch with alumni through the Alumni Newsletter, Facebook and the School of Geography website.

Graduates are known to have gone on to find positions in the following areas: environmental management, management and consultancy, GIS, government and NGOs, financial services and further study.

References

External links 
 School of Geography website

University of Leeds
Geography departments in the United Kingdom